The  is a disabled nuclear power plant located on a  site in the towns of Ōkuma and Futaba in Fukushima Prefecture, Japan. The plant suffered major damage from the magnitude 9.0 earthquake and tsunami that hit Japan on March 11, 2011. The chain of events caused radiation leaks and permanently damaged several of its American-designed reactors, making them impossible to restart. By political decision, the remaining reactors were not restarted.

First commissioned in 1971, the plant consists of six American-designed boiling water reactors. These light water reactors drove electrical generators with a combined power of 4.7 GWe, making Fukushima Daiichi one of the 15 largest nuclear power stations in the world. Fukushima was the first nuclear plant to be designed, constructed, and run in conjunction with General Electric and Tokyo Electric Power Company (TEPCO).

The March 2011 disaster disabled the reactor cooling systems, leading to releases of radioactivity and triggering a  evacuation zone surrounding the plant; the releases continue to this day. On April 20, 2011, the Japanese authorities declared the  evacuation zone a no-go area which may only be entered under government supervision.

In November 2011, the first journalists were allowed to visit the plant. They described a scene of devastation in which three of the reactor buildings were destroyed; the grounds were covered with mangled trucks, crumpled water tanks and other debris left by the tsunami; and radioactive levels were so high that visitors were only allowed to stay for a few hours.

In April 2012, Units 1–4 were shut down. Units 2–4 were shut down on April 19, while Unit 1 was the last of these four units to be shut down on April 20 at midnight. In December 2013 TEPCO decided none of the undamaged units will reopen.

In April 2021, the Japanese government approved the discharge of radioactive water, which has been treated to remove radionuclides other than tritium, into the Pacific Ocean over the course of 30 years.

The sister nuclear plant Fukushima Daini ("number two"),  to the south, is also run by TEPCO. It also suffered serious damage during the tsunami, especially at the seawater intakes of all four units, but was successfully shut down and brought to a safe state through extraordinary actions by the plant crew.

Power plant information

The reactors for Units 1, 2, and 6 were supplied by General Electric, those for Units 3 and 5 by Toshiba, and Unit 4 by Hitachi. All six reactors were designed by General Electric. Architectural design for General Electric's units was done by Ebasco. All construction was done by Kajima. Since September 2010, Unit 3 has been fueled by a small fraction (6%) of plutonium containing mixed-oxide (MOX) fuel, rather than the low enriched uranium (LEU) used in the other reactors. Units 1–5 were built with Mark I type (light bulb torus) containment structures. The Mark I containment structure was slightly increased in volume by Japanese engineers. Unit 6 has a Mark II type (over/under) containment structure.

Unit 1 is a 460 MWe boiling water reactor (BWR-3) constructed in July 1967. It commenced commercial electrical production on March 26, 1971, and was initially scheduled for shutdown in early 2011. In February 2011, Japanese regulators granted an extension of ten years for the continued operation of the reactor. It was damaged during the 2011 Tōhoku earthquake and tsunami.

Unit 1 was designed for a peak ground acceleration of 0.18 g (1.74 m/s2) and a response spectrum based on the 1952 Kern County earthquake, but rated for 0.498 g. The design basis for Units 3 and 6 were 0.45 g (4.41 m/s2) and 0.46 g (4.48 m/s2) respectively. All units were inspected after the 1978 Miyagi earthquake when the ground acceleration was 0.125 g (1.22 m/s2) for 30 seconds, but no damage to the critical parts of the reactor was discovered.

The reactor's emergency diesel generators and DC batteries, crucial components in helping keep the reactors cool in the event of a power loss, were located in the basements of the reactor turbine buildings. The reactor design plans provided by General Electric specified placing the generators and batteries in that location, but mid-level engineers working on the construction of the plant were concerned that this made the backup power systems vulnerable to flooding. TEPCO elected to strictly follow General Electric's design in the construction of the reactors.

Site layout

The plant is on a bluff which was originally 35 meters above sea level. During construction, however, TEPCO lowered the height of the bluff by 25 meters. One reason for lowering the bluff was to allow the base of the reactors to be constructed on solid bedrock in order to mitigate the threat posed by earthquakes. Another reason was the lowered height would keep the running costs of the seawater pumps low. TEPCO's analysis of the tsunami risk when planning the site's construction determined that the lower elevation was safe because the sea wall would provide adequate protection for the maximum tsunami assumed by the design basis. However, the lower site elevation did increase the vulnerability for a tsunami larger than anticipated in design.

The Fukushima Daiichi site is divided into two reactor groups, the leftmost group – when viewing from the ocean – contains units 4, 3, 2 and 1 going from left to right. The rightmost group – when viewing from the ocean – contains the newer units 5 and 6, respectively, the positions from left to right. A set of seawalls protrude into the ocean, with the water intake in the middle and water discharge outlets on either side.

Reactor data
Units 7 and 8 were planned to start construction in April 2012 and 2013 and to come into operation in October 2016 and 2017 respectively. The project was formally canceled by TEPCO in April 2011 after local authorities questioned the fact that they were still included in the supply plan for 2011, released in March 2011, after the accidents. The company stated that the plan had been drafted before the earthquake.

Electrical connections
The Fukushima Daiichi plant is connected to the power grid by four lines, the 500 kV Futaba Line (双葉線), the two 275 kV Ōkuma Lines (大熊線) and the 66 kV Yonomori Line (夜の森線) to the Shin-Fukushima (New Fukushima) substation.

The Shin-Fukushima substation also connects to the Fukushima Daini plant by the Tomioka Line (富岡線). Its major connection to the north is the Iwaki Line (いわき幹線), which is owned by Tohoku Electric Power. It has two connections to the south-west that connect it to the Shin-Iwaki substation (新いわき).

Operating history

The plant reactors came online one at a time beginning in 1970 and the last in 1979. From the end of 2002 through 2005, the reactors were among those shut down for a time for safety checks due to the TEPCO data falsification scandal. On February 28, 2011, TEPCO submitted a report to the Japanese Nuclear and Industrial Safety Agency admitting that the company had previously submitted fake inspection and repair reports. The report revealed that TEPCO failed to inspect more than 30 technical components of the six reactors, including power boards for the reactor's temperature control valves, as well as components of cooling systems such as water pump motors and emergency power diesel generators. In 2008, the IAEA warned Japan that the Fukushima plant was built using outdated safety guidelines, and could be a "serious problem" during a large earthquake. The warning led to the building of an emergency response center in 2010, used during the response to the 2011 nuclear accident.

On April 5, 2011, TEPCO vice president Takashi Fujimoto announced that the company was canceling plans to build Reactors No. 7 and 8. On May 20 TEPCO's board of directors' officially voted to decommission Units 1 through 4 of the Fukushima Daiichi nuclear power plant and to cancel plans to build units 7 and 8. It refused however to make a decision regarding units 5 and 6 of the station or units 1 to 4 of the Fukushima Daini nuclear power station until a detailed investigation is made. In December 2013 TEPCO decided to decommission the undamaged units 5 and 6; they may be used to test remote clean-up methods before use on the damaged reactors.

Warnings and design critique
In 1990, the U.S. Nuclear Regulatory Commission (NRC) ranked the failure of the emergency electricity generators and subsequent failure of the cooling systems of plants in seismically very active regions one of the most likely risks. The Japanese Nuclear and Industrial Safety Agency (NISA) cited this report in 2004. According to Jun Tateno, a former NISA scientist, TEPCO did not react to these warnings and did not respond with any measures.

Filmmaker Adam Curtis mentioned the risks of the type of boiling water reactors cooling systems such as those in Fukushima I, and claimed the risks were known since 1971 in a series of documentaries in the BBC in 1992 and advised that PWR type reactors should have been used.

Tokyo Electric Power Company (TEPCO) operated the station and was warned their seawall was insufficient to withstand a powerful tsunami, but did not increase the seawall height in response. The Onagawa Nuclear Power Plant, operated by Tohoku Electric Power, ran closer to the epicenter of the earthquake, but had much more robust seawalls of greater height and avoided severe accident.

Incidents and accidents

Prior to March 2011

1978
Fuel rods fell in reactor No. 3, causing a nuclear reaction. It took about seven and a half hours to place the rods back into proper positions. There was no record of the incident, as TEPCO had covered it up; interviews of two former workers in 2007 led to its discovery by TEPCO management.

February 25, 2009
A manual shutdown was initiated during the middle of a start-up operation. The cause was a high pressure alarm that was caused by the shutting of a turbine bypass valve. The reactor was at 12% of full power when the alarm occurred at 4:03 am (local time) due to a pressure increase to 1,030 psi (7,100 kPa), exceeding the regulatory limit of 1,002 psi (6,910 kPa). The reactor was reduced to 0% power, which exceeded the 5% threshold that requires event reporting, and pressure dropped back under the regulatory limit at 4:25 am. Later, at 8:49 am the control blades were completely inserted, constituting a manual reactor shutdown. An inspection then confirmed that one of the 8 bypass valves had closed and that the valve had a bad driving fluid connection. The reactor had been starting up following its 25th regular inspection, which had begun on October 18, 2008.

March 26, 2009
Unit 3 had problems with over-insertion of control blades during outage. Repair work was being done on equipment that regulates the driving pressure for the control blades, and when a valve was opened at 2:23 pm a control blade drift alarm went off. On later inspection, it was found that several of the rods had been unintentionally inserted.

November 2, 2010
Unit 5 had an automatic SCRAM while an operator was conducting an adjustment to the control blade insertion pattern. The SCRAM was caused by a reactor low water level alarm. The turbine tripped along with the reactor and there was no radiation injury to workers.

Nuclear disaster of March 11, 2011

On March 11, 2011, an earthquake categorized as 9.0 MW on the moment magnitude scale occurred at 14:46 Japan Standard Time (JST) off the northeast coast of Japan, one of the most powerful earthquakes in history. Units 4, 5 and 6 had been "shut down" prior to the earthquake for planned maintenance. The remaining reactors were shut down/SCRAMed automatically after the earthquake, and the remaining decay heat of the fuel was being cooled with power from emergency generators. The subsequent destructive tsunami with waves of up to  that over-topped the station, which had seawalls, disabled emergency generators required to cool the reactors and Spent fuel pools in Units 1–5. Over the following three weeks there was evidence of partial nuclear meltdowns in units 1, 2 and 3: visible explosions, suspected to be caused by hydrogen gas, in units 1 and 3; a suspected explosion in unit 2, that may have damaged the primary containment vessel; and a possible uncovering of the Spent fuel pools in Units 1, 3 and 4. Units 5 & 6 were reported on March 19, by the station-wide alert log updates of the IAEA, to have gradually rising spent fuel pool temperatures as they had likewise lost offsite power, but onsite power provided by Unit 6's two diesel generators that had not been flooded, were configured to do double-duty and cool both Unit 5 and 6's spent fuel pools "and cores". As a precautionary measure, vents in the roofs of these two units were also made to prevent the possibility of hydrogen gas pressurization and then ignition.

Radiation releases from Units 1–4 forced the evacuation of 83,000 residents from towns around the plant. The triple meltdown also caused concerns about contamination of food and water supplies, including the 2011 rice harvest, and also the health effects of radiation on workers at the plant. Scientists estimate that the accident released 18 quadrillion becquerels of caesium-137 into the Pacific Ocean, contaminating 150 square miles of the ocean floor.

The events at units 1, 2 and 3 have been rated at Level 5 each on the International Nuclear Event Scale, and those at unit 4 as Level 3 (Serious Incident) events, with the overall plant rating at Level 7 (major release of radioactive material with widespread health and environmental effects requiring implementation of planned and extended countermeasures).

After March 2011

April 3, 2011
2 bodies were discovered in the basement turbine room, most likely because the workers ran there during the tsunami.

April 9, 2013
TEPCO publicly admits Radionuclide contaminated water may have leaked from the storage units, possibly contaminating the soil and water nearby. The leak was controlled and stored in containment tanks. Contaminated water continued to accumulate at the plant, and TEPCO announces plans to filter radioactive particles and discharge purified water.

July 9, 2013
TEPCO officials reported that radioactive caesium was 90 times higher than it was 3 days prior (July 6), and that it may spread into the Pacific Ocean. TEPCO reported that the caesium-134 levels in the well water were measured at 9 kilobecquerel per liter, 150 times the legal level, while Caesium-137 was measured at 18 kilobecquerel per liter, 200 times the permitted level.

August 7, 2013
Japanese officials said highly radioactive water was leaking from Fukushima Daiichi into the Pacific Ocean at a rate of 300 tons (about 272 metric tons) per day. Japanese Prime Minister Shinzo Abe ordered government officials to step in.

April 12, 2016
Reactors were being cooled with 300 tonnes of water each day.

September 10, 2019
Since the 3 plants was damaged by the earthquake, tsunami, and subsequent hydrogen gas explosions in 2011, TEPCO has continued to pump water onto the previously melted-down fuel cores to prevent them from once again overheating. Contaminated cooling water has collected on site, where more than 1 million tons has been stored in hundreds of tall steel tanks.  Large filtration systems are used to clean the water of its radioactive contaminants, but cannot remove tritium, a radioactive isotope of hydrogen (Hydrogen-3) bonded into water molecules (tritiated water).  In 2016, only 14 grams of tritium in total was estimated to be contained in 800,000 cubic meters of contaminated water stored on site.   As the tritium-contaminated water continued to accumulate, the site will run out of space to build more tanks by 2022, when it may have to pump the purified but tritiated water directly into the Pacific Ocean. It is not known yet how much water will be released by TEPCO, which will dilute the water first.

April 13, 2021

Japan's government approved the release of treated radioactive water from the plant into the Pacific Ocean – beginning in 2023 – over the course of an estimated 40 years.

July 23, 2021

A note in the 2020 Tokyo Olympic games opening speech referenced the disaster and how Japan has recovered from the disaster.

Dismantling of reactors

The reactors will take 30–40 years to be decommissioned. On August 1, 2013, the Japanese Industry Minister Toshimitsu Motegi approved the creation of a structure to develop the technologies and processes necessary to dismantle the four reactors damaged in the Fukushima accident.

To reduce the flow of contaminated water into the Pacific Ocean, TEPCO spent ¥34.5 billion (approx. $324 million) to build a 1.5 kilometer-long underground wall of frozen soil around the plant, constructed by Kajima Corporation. 1,500 , supercooled pipes were inserted into the ground in order to freeze the surrounding groundwater and soil. The wall ultimately failed to significantly decrease the groundwater flowing into the site.

The cost of decommissioning and decontamination of the Fukushima Daiichi nuclear power plant has been estimated at $195 billion, which includes compensation payouts to victims of the disaster. The amount also includes decommissioning of Fukushima Daiichi reactors, which is estimated at $71 billion. TEPCO will shoulder $143 billion of decommissioning and decontamination, while the Ministry of Finance of Japan will provide $17 billion. Other power companies will also contribute to the cost.

On September 26, 2020, Prime Minister Yoshihide Suga visited the Daiichi Nuclear Power Plant to show that his cabinet prioritized the reconstruction of areas that were affected by natural and nuclear disasters.

See also

 GE Three
 List of boiling water reactors
 List of earthquakes in Japan
 List of nuclear power plants in Japan
 Nuclear power in Japan
2011 earthquake and tsunami accident
 Fukushima Daiichi nuclear disaster
 International reactions to the Fukushima Daiichi nuclear disaster
 Japanese reaction to Fukushima Daiichi nuclear disaster
 Radiation effects from the Fukushima Daiichi nuclear disaster

References

External links

 Fukushima Daiichi Decommissioning Official site
 Archived photo. Units 1–4 can be seen from left to right.
 3D Google Earth view 

Former nuclear power stations in Japan
1967 establishments in Japan
Fukushima Daiichi nuclear disaster
Buildings and structures in Fukushima Prefecture
Tokyo Electric Power Company
Nuclear power stations with closed reactors
Ōkuma, Fukushima